Surface activated bonding (SAB) is a low-temperature wafer bonding technology with atomically clean and activated surfaces. Surface activation prior to bonding by using fast atom bombardment is typically employed to clean the surfaces. High-strength bonding of semiconductor, metal, and dielectric can be obtained even at room temperature.

Overview 
In the standard SAB method, wafer surfaces are activated by argon fast atom bombardment in ultra-high vacuum (UHV) of 10−4–10−7 Pa. The  bombardment removes adsorbed contaminants and native oxides on the surfaces. The activated surfaces are atomically clean and reactive for formation of direct bonds between wafers when they are brought into contact even at room temperature.

Researches on SAB
The SAB method has been studied for bonding of various materials, as shown in Table I.  

The standard SAB, however, failed to bond some materials such as SiO2 and polymer films. The modified SAB was developed to solve this problem, by using a sputtering deposited Si intermediate layer to improve the bond strength.

The combined SAB has been developed for SiO2-SiO2 and Cu/SiO2 hybrid bonding, without use of any intermediate layer.

Technical specifications

References

Wafer bonding
Semiconductor technology
Electronics manufacturing
Packaging (microfabrication)
Semiconductor device fabrication
Microelectronic and microelectromechanical systems